Lambrecht is a Germanic name and may refer to:

People

Given name
Jan Lambrecht Domien Sleeckx (1818–1901), Flemish writer
Master of the Saint Lambrecht Votive Altarpiece (fl. 1410 – 1440), Austrian painter

Surname
Bjorg Lambrecht (1997–2019), Belgian road bicycle racer
Christine Lambrecht (born 1965), German politician
Henri-Charles Lambrecht (1848–1889), bishop of Ghent
Kálmán Lambrecht (1889–1936), Hungarian palaeontologist
P. J. Tracy, pseudonym of American authors Patricia J. (died 2016) and Traci Lambrecht
Ray Lambrecht (1918–2014), American car dealer
Roger Lambrecht (1916–1979), Belgian road bicycle racer
Walter R. L. Lambrecht (born 1955), Belgian physicist

Places
Lambrecht (Verbandsgemeinde), Germany
Lambrecht, Rhineland-Palatinate
Sankt Lambrecht, Austria
St. Lambrecht's Abbey, a Benedictine monastery

Other uses
2861 Lambrecht, an asteroid named after Hermann Lambrecht (1908-1983), University of Jena astronomer

See also
Lambrechts, Dutch patronymic surname
Lambrichs, surname of the same origin
Lambert (disambiguation)

Dutch masculine given names
Surnames from given names